The New Brunswick Scotties Tournament of Hearts is the New Brunswick provincial women's curling tournament. The tournament is run by the New Brunswick Curling Association. The winning team represents New Brunswick at the Scotties Tournament of Hearts.

Past winners
(National champions in bold)

Notes

References

See also

Scotties Tournament of Hearts provincial tournaments
Curling competitions in New Brunswick
1947 establishments in New Brunswick